Baritone Madness, is the debut album by baritone saxophonist Nick Brignola's Sextet featuring Pepper Adams which was recorded in late 1977 becoming the first release on the Bee Hive label.

Reception 

Allmusic writer Scott Yanow states "This album lives up to its title. ... It is obvious from the song titles that this is very much a bebop jam session date, and quite a few sparks do fly.".

Track listing 
All compositions by Charlie Parker except where noted.
 "Donna Lee" – 9:33
 "Billie's Bounce" – 11:15
 "Marmeduke" – 11:30
 "Body and Soul" (Johnny Green, Edward Heyman, Robert Sour, Frank Eyton) – 7:01
 "Alone Together" (Arthur Schwartz, Howard Dietz) – 6:57

Personnel 
Nick Brignola (tracks 1–4), Pepper Adams (tracks 1–3) – baritone saxophone
Ted Curson – trumpet, flugelhorn (tracks 2 & 3)
Derek Smith – piano
Dave Holland – bass
Roy Haynes – drums

References 

Nick Brignola albums
Pepper Adams albums
1977 albums
Bee Hive Records albums